Dreamer is the sixteenth studio album by Brazilian jazz pianist Eliane Elias. It was released on May 4, 2004 by Bluebird. This is the second release on the Bluebird label supported by a full orchestra, with arrangements by conductor Rob Mathes.

Reception
John Bush of Allmusic stated "Her solos, though beautiful and contemplative, are short and usually hug the shore. As an overall musician, Elias has sure instincts when playing or singing, and compensates for her lack of vocal strength by rarely lingering on her notes." A Billboard'''s reviewer commented, "It's a tasteful album, made so by Elias' seductive, husky vocals, the subtle string orchestration and an overall Brazilian feel." Dave Gelly of The Guardian added, "Superficially, this is a vocal-and-piano album - ballads and bossas with light rhythm accompaniment, plus added colour from a string section - but the minute perfection of touch, timbre and timing sets it apart." Christopher Loudon of JazzTimes'' wrote, "Elias’ piano work on these 11 tracks is as effortlessly elegant as ever."

Track listing

Personnel
 Eliane Elias – piano, vocals
 Michael Brecker – tenor saxophone 
 Mike Mainieri – vibraphone
 Guilherme Monteiro – guitar
 Oscar Castro-Neves – guitar
 Marc Johnson – bass guitar
 Paulo Braga – drums
 Diva Gray – backing vocals
 Martee Lebow – backing vocals
 Vaneese Thomas  – backing vocals

Chart positions

References

External links

2004 albums
Eliane Elias albums
Bluebird Records albums